Elisabeth Mahn (born 2 April 1986) is an Austrian synchronized swimmer.

Elisabeth competed in the women's duet at the 2008 Summer Olympics and finished in 22nd place with her partner Nadine Brandl.

References 

1986 births
Living people
Austrian synchronized swimmers
Olympic synchronized swimmers of Austria
Synchronized swimmers at the 2008 Summer Olympics